The 1988–89 South Pacific cyclone season was an active tropical cyclone season with an above average number of tropical cyclones observed.


Seasonal summary 

During the season despite positive values of the Southern Oscillation Index being recorded throughout the season, there was an unusual distribution of tropical cyclones with five developing between 180° and 140°W. This unusual distribution of tropical cyclones was attributed to the relatively rapid development of an active South Pacific Convergence Zone over an area of cooler than normal sea surface temperatures during January and February 1989.

Systems

Tropical Cyclone Eseta 

On December 15, the FMS reported that a tropical depression had developed, within the monsoon trough just to the north of Vanuatu. The system subsequently persisted for a week with little change in intensity, as it gradually moved south-southwest over Vanuatu and New Caledonia. Between December 20–21, an area of high pressure developed to the south of the system, which prevented any further southwards movement. The system subsequently moved north-eastwards and passed over southern Vanuatu, before the FMS reported late on December 23, that the cyclone had become equivalent to a category 1 tropical cyclone and named it Eseta. During December 24, the system intensified further, before the FMS reported later that day that Eseta had peaked with 10-minute sustained wind speeds of 100 km/h (65 mph). The system subsequently degenerated into an extratropical depression and impacting New Zealand between December 29–30.

As a tropical depression, Eseta caused heavy rainfall within Vanuatu, however there were no reports of any damages to property or crops. The heavy rain lead to widespread flooding over various parts of the island nation, with minor damage to roads and crops reported. Several homes were evacuate while it was thought that the heavy rain had contributed to at least 50 injuries with seven of those in a weather-related car accident.

Tropical Cyclone Delilah 

On January 1, Tropical Cyclone Delilah moved into the South Pacific basin from the Australian region, as a category 1 tropical cyclone on the Australian scale. During that day as the system continued to intensify and move south-eastwards towards New Caledonia and the Loyalty Islands, the JTWC initiated advisories on the system and designated it as Tropical Cyclone 04P. During the next day Delilah started to weaken and transition into an extra tropical cyclone, as vertical wind shear over the system increased and the upper level westerlies intensified. The system subsequently became an extra tropical cyclone during January 4, and started moving southwards towards New Zealand. The system subsequently passed close to northern New Zealand during January 7, before it merged with a cold front during January 8.

Tropical Cyclone Fili 

Over the next few days the depression moved south-westwards before it weakened slightly during January 3, with atmospheric convection surrounding the system decreasing. The system subsequently recurved and started to move towards the southeast towards the island nation of Niue. The FMS subsequently named the system Fili during January 5, after it had become a Category 2 tropical cyclone with peak wind speeds of 95 km/h (60 mph). After being named the system continued to move south-eastwards, before it was last noted, well to the southeast of the Cook Islands during January 8. There was no damage to any islands associated with Fili, however, the FMS reported that strong winds had appeared to cause some minor damage on Niue.

Tropical Cyclone Gina 

Gina existed from January 6 to January 9.

Severe Tropical Cyclone Harry 

Over the next day the system moved eastwards and developed into a category 1 tropical cyclone.

Severe Tropical Cyclone Hinano 

The system subsequently moved south-westwards and was classified as a weak tropical depression by the Tahiti Meteorological office during February 21.

Severe Tropical Cyclone Ivy 

On February 21, a depression developed within the monsoon trough to the north of Vanuatu, and started to move towards the east.

Severe Tropical Cyclone Judy 

The system subsequently moved south-westwards and was classified as a moderate tropical storm during February 23, by the French Polynesian Meteorological Service.

Tropical Cyclone Kerry 

On March 29, TCWC Nadi started to monitor a westward moving tropical depression that had developed within a monsoon trough about x to the x of x. Over the next few days, the system moved towards the west before after it several large pressure drops were reported,

Severe Tropical Cyclone Lili 

Lili existed from April 6 to April 13.

Tropical Cyclone Meena 

On May 1, TCWC Nadi reported that a shallow depression had developed within the monsoon trough, over the south-eastern Solomon Islands. Over the next few days the system remained weak and ill-defined as it moved slowly southwards. On May 3, the JTWC initiated advisories on the system and designated it as Tropical Cyclone 27P, as it started to gradually intensify further. The system was subsequently named Meena by TCWC Nadi during May 4, as it had developed into a category 1 tropical cyclone on the Australian scale. Meena subsequently moved into the Australian region during May 5, where it reached its peak intensity before making landfall on the Cape York Peninsular during May 9.

Tropical Depression 28P (Ernie) 

Tropical Depression 28P developed on May 6 and then exited the basin on May 9.

Other systems 
According to TCWC Nadi, a tropical depression existed between May 28 and May 30, to the far west of Fiji, with the associated rainband of the storm located over Fiji between May 27 and May 31. The associated rainband caused some flooding in low-lying areas on the island of Viti Levu.

Season effects 
This table lists all the storms that developed in the South Pacific to the east of longitude 160°E during the 1989–90 season. It includes their intensity on the Australian tropical cyclone intensity scale, duration, name, landfalls, deaths, and damages. All data is taken from the warning centers from the region unless otherwise noted.

|-
|  ||  || bgcolor=#| || bgcolor=#| || bgcolor=#| || Vanuatu, New Caledonia, Fiji, New Zealand || > || None ||
|-
|  ||  || bgcolor=#| || bgcolor=#| || bgcolor=#| || New Caledonia, New Zealand || || 2 ||
|-
|  ||  || bgcolor=#| || bgcolor=#| || bgcolor=#| || None || None || None ||
|-
|  ||  || bgcolor=#| || bgcolor=#| || bgcolor=#| || Samoa ||  || ||
|-
|  ||  || bgcolor=#| || bgcolor=#| || bgcolor=#| || New Caledonia || || ||
|-
|  ||  || bgcolor=#| || bgcolor=#| || bgcolor=#| || Fiji || || Nine ||
|-
|  ||  || bgcolor=#| || bgcolor=#| || bgcolor=#| || French Polynesia || || ||
|-
|  ||  || bgcolor=#| || bgcolor=#| || bgcolor=#| || New Caledonia, Vanuatu || || ||
|-
|  ||  || bgcolor=#| || bgcolor=#| || bgcolor=#| || || || ||
|-
|  ||  || bgcolor=#| || bgcolor=#| || bgcolor=#| || Fiji || || ||
|-
|  ||  || bgcolor=#| || bgcolor=#| || bgcolor=#| || New Caledonia || || ||
|-
|  ||  || bgcolor=#| || bgcolor=#| || bgcolor=#| || Solomon Islands || Minor || None ||
|-
|  ||  || bgcolor=#| || bgcolor=#| || bgcolor=#| || || || ||
|-
|  || || bgcolor=#| || bgcolor=#| || bgcolor=#| || None || None || None ||
|-

See also 

 List of off-season South Pacific tropical cyclones
 Atlantic hurricane seasons: 1988, 1989
 Pacific hurricane seasons: 1988, 1989
 Pacific typhoon seasons: 1988, 1989
 North Indian Ocean cyclone seasons: 1988, 1989

Notes

References

External links 

 
South Pacific cyclone seasons
Articles which contain graphical timelines